The Volta Grande Dam is an embankment dam on the Grande River about  west of Água Comprida, Brazil. The dam is on the border of Conceição das Alagoas municipality in the state of Minas Gerais to the north and Miguelópolis municipality in the state of São Paulo to the south. It was constructed between 1970 and 1974 for the purpose of hydroelectric power generation. The power station at the dam has an installed capacity of 380 MW and is owned by CEMIG.

See also

List of power stations in Brazil

References

Dams completed in 1974
Energy infrastructure completed in 1974
Dams in Minas Gerais
Dams on the Rio Grande (Paraná River tributary)
Hydroelectric power stations in Brazil
1974 establishments in Brazil
Embankment dams
Dams in São Paulo (state)